The FedEx Cup is a championship trophy for the PGA Tour.  Its introduction marked the first time that men's professional golf had a playoff system. Announced in November 2005, it was first awarded in 2007. Rory McIlroy is the 2022 champion. This competition is sponsored by FedEx.

The FedEx Cup is the central professional golf competition that compares player performance across part of the PGA Tour season in a League and Playoffs structure.

Rule changes
The PGA Tour adjusted the rules around the FedEx Cup in each of the two years after its introduction in 2007. Each set of changes was introduced to address issues that arose the previous year, particularly with the playoffs portion of the FedEx Cup:

 In February 2008, the changes were designed to allow more golfers a chance to improve their positions on the points list as the playoffs progress. The changes involve a tightening of the playoff reset points and awarding more points to playoff participants. This is effectively a penalty on those players who skip a playoff event.
 In November 2008, the changes were designed to help ensure that the championship would not be won until every golfer who qualified finished playing the final playoff event. This resulted from the fact that Vijay Singh had accumulated enough points through the first three playoff events in 2008 to guarantee that he would win the Cup without finishing the final event.
 In 2013, FedEx Cup points began to determine the 125 golfers who would retain their PGA Tour playing privileges (popularly known as "tour cards") for the following season. Previously, this was determined by position on the tour's money list at the end of the year.

In 2019, the total bonus pool was increased by $25 million to $70 million, with the FedEx Cup champion earning $15 million. Among that $70 million was a $10 million Regular Season bonus pool, sponsored by Wyndham, tied to the final Regular Season FedEx Cup standings. This recognized the 10 players who earn the most FedEx Cup points through the Wyndham Championship, with the Regular Season champion earning $2 million. Beginning in 2021, the Regular Season bonus pool became sponsored by Comcast Business. As of 2022, the Regular Season Bonus Pool was $20 million with the champion earning $4 million. Also in 2019, the FedEx Cup Playoffs finale, the Tour Championship, instituted a strokes-based system, FedEx Cup Starting Strokes. In 2022, the FedEx Cup bonus pool purse increased to $75 million, with the winner's share coming in at $18,000,000.

Beginning in 2019, at the conclusion of the regular season (after the Wyndham Championship), the top 125 players in the FedEx Cup standings become eligible to play in the FedEx Cup Playoffs, a series of three events over the month of August (from 2007 to 2018, the FedEx Cup Playoffs included four events). Points earned during the PGA Tour Regular Season carry over to the Playoffs. The FedEx Cup Playoffs events feature a progressive cut, with fields of 125 for The Northern Trust (Liberty National Golf Club, Jersey City, New Jersey), 70 for the BMW Championship (Medinah Country Club, Medinah, Illinois) and 30 for the Tour Championship (East Lake Golf Club, Atlanta, Georgia), where the FedEx Cup Champion is determined. As of 2022, the Northern Trust was renamed the FedEx St. Jude Championship and moved to TPC Southwind in Memphis, Tennessee. In the event an eligible player is unable or chooses not to play, the field is shortened and no alternates are added. Points from the missing positions are not awarded. The FedEx St. Jude Championship cuts the field to low 70 and ties after 36 holes, while the BMW Championship and Tour Championship are no-cut events. The first two Playoffs events award 2,000 points to the winner (quadruple points of Regular Season events).

The Tour Championship features a strokes-based system (FedEx Cup Starting Strokes) instituted for the first time in 2019. The FedEx Cup points leader after the first two Playoffs events begins the Tour Championship at 10-under par. The No. 2 player will start at 8 under. The No. 3 player starts at 7 under; the No. 4 player starts at 6 under; the No. 5 player starts at 5 under. Players 6–10 start at 4 under; players 11–15 start at 3 under; players 16–20 start at 2 under; players 21–25 start at 1 under; and players 26–30 start at even par. At the Tour Championship, the player with the lowest aggregate score over 72 holes when combined with his FedEx Cup Starting Strokes wins the Tour Championship and is also crowned FedEx Cup champion. The Tour Championship win is considered an official victory and the FedEx Cup champion also earns a bonus of $18 million and a five-year PGA Tour exemption.

Format

Qualifying for the playoffs
The season structure changed beginning in the fall of 2013, but the qualifying criteria have not changed since 2009.

The first part of the season is known as the "regular season" starting in October, culminating in 3 events called the "playoffs" in August. The 2022-23 season includes 44 regular-season events before the start of the three-event playoff series that ends at the Tour Championship Aug. 24-27. 

Players earn points in each event they play. For all regular-season PGA Tour events, 500 FedEx Cups are awarded to the winner, with points also being earned by every player making the cut. In World Golf Championship and other "designated" events, 550 FedEx Cup points goes to the winner, while 600 points are given to the champion of the four majors and the Players. Lastly, 300 points are given to the winner of any event played in the same week as a major or "designated" event. 

The goal is to be among the top 125 points leaders following the final event of the regular season. Only those players who are regular full-time members of the PGA Tour earn points. A non-member who joins the PGA Tour in mid-season is eligible to earn points in the first event he plays after officially joining the Tour.

At the end of the regular season, the top 125 players participate in the playoffs. The number of points awarded for winning each playoff event is 2000, which is four times the amount awarded for a typical regular season tournament.  Points won in playoff events are added to those for the regular season, and the fields are reduced as the playoffs proceed. Since 2013 the top 125 on the FedEx Cup points list also retain their tour cards for the following season.

After the second playoff event, as of 2019, the FedEx Cup points leader after the first two Playoffs events begins the Tour Championship at 10-under par. The No. 2 player starts at 8 under. The No. 3 player starts at 7 under; the No. 4 player starts at 6 under; the No. 5 player starts at 5 under. Players 6–10 start at 4 under; players 11–15 start at 3 under; players 16–20 start at 2 under; players 21–25 start at 1 under; and players 26–30 start at even par. At the Tour Championship, the player with the lowest aggregate score over 72 holes when combined with his FedEx Cup Starting Strokes wins the Tour Championship and is also crowned FedEx Cup champion. The Tour Championship win is considered an official victory and the FedEx Cup champion also earns a bonus of $18 million and a five-year PGA Tour exemption.

Playoff events

For the Tour Championship, only the top 30 points leaders after the BMW Championship are eligible. If for any reason, a player among the top 30 does not compete in the Tour Championship, he will not be replaced.

Playoff rewards

As of 2022, the player with the most points after the Tour Championship wins the FedEx Cup itself and $18 million of a $75 million bonus fund. The runner-up gets $6.5 million, 3rd place $5 million, 4th place $4 million, 5th place $3 million, and so on down to $85,000 for 126th through 150th place. Beginning with the 2013 season, non-exempt players who finish 126th-150th in the FedEx Cup are given conditional PGA Tour status, but can attempt to improve their priority rankings through the Korn Ferry Tour Finals. Previously, conditional status was earned through the money list.

In 2007, the money was placed into their tax-deferred retirement accounts, not given in cash. Players under 45 are not able to access any 2007 FedEx Cup bonuses (as opposed to prize money earned in the tournaments themselves) until turning 45. They can invest their bonus in any manner they choose, and once they turn 45, can choose to defer payment until they turn 60 or play in fewer than 15 PGA Tour events in a season. Once a player chooses to take payments from his fund, he will receive monthly checks for five years.

Because of possible legislation affecting deferred retirement plans, in the wake of business stories that speculated that Tiger Woods could amass a $1 billion retirement fund if he won the FedEx Cup six more times, the PGA Tour announced a change to the payout system effective in 2008. The top 10 finishers now receive the bulk of their FedEx Cup bonuses in cash up front; for example, the 2008 FedEx Cup champion received $9 million up front and $1 million in his tax-deferred retirement account. FedEx Cup bonuses to finishers below the top 10 are still paid solely into the players' retirement accounts.

The winner of the FedEx Cup also receives a five-year exemption on the PGA Tour, mirroring the exemption that was given to the tour's leading money winner  prior to 2017. Before the change in format in 2019 that made it impossible for the FedEx Cup and the Tour Championship to be won by two different players, the Tour Championship winner received a three-year exemption. Winners of other playoff events receive only the standard 2-year exemption.

Since 2013, the FedEx Cup standings have been the primary means of determining exemption status for the following year; the 125 players who qualify for the playoffs are fully exempt. Players who finish 126th through 150th, if not exempt through other means such as a recent tournament win, retain conditional status; these, along with finishers 151 through 200, are eligible for the Korn Ferry Tour Finals, through which they may regain their cards if not already exempt.

Before 2013, the money list rather than the FedEx Cup standings determined exemption status. Since the money and point distributions were different and the money list was not finalized until after the Fall Series, it was common for players to qualify for the playoffs and still lose their card at the end of the season.

Winners

Individual tournament winners

Career FedEx Cup bonus leaders

Source

See also
List of point distributions of the FedEx Cup

References

External links
Unless otherwise indicated, all are pgatour.com links.
The PGA Tour's FedExCup Home Page
PGA Tour Fan's Quick Guide to FedExCup
FedExCup Points for Regular Season, Playoffs and Tour Championship Reset.
Official FedExCup Points Standings
During Regular Season
During The Playoffs
Official PGA Tour Schedule – FedExCup Regular and Playoff events
Initial announcement of the FedEx Cup Series
June 2006 announcement giving details of the points system and bonus fund
November 2006 announcement on size of playoff fields
Notes: FedExCup winner to get five-year exemption